White admiral may refer to the following species of butterflies:

Limenitis arthemis, in North America
Limenitis camilla, in southern Britain and much of Europe and the Palearctic, extending as far east as Japan
Limenitis trivena, in tropical and subtropical Asia

See also
 Admiral of the White, a former senior rank of the Royal Navy

Animal common name disambiguation pages